The Massacre in Zakroczym, Poland, took place on 28 September 1939 when, in spite of a cease-fire, soldiers of Panzerdivision Kempf stormed Polish positions at Zakroczym, where soldiers from the 2nd Infantry Division were getting ready to surrender. Hundreds of Polish soldiers were murdered. The rest were beaten and abused. Many civilians were killed or wounded. German troops broke into houses, robbed them, set on fire, and tossed hand grenades into the basements filled with scared civilians. Kazimierz Szczerbatko estimated, based on the testimony of the eyewitnesses, that the Germans killed around 500 soldiers and 100 civilians.

The massacre might have been revenge for the Battle of Mława which cost the Germans 1,800 killed, 3,000 wounded, 1,000 missing, and where Panzer Division Kempf lost 72 tanks in spite of using Polish civilians as human shields chased in front of their tanks.

References

Sources

1939 in Poland
Massacres in 1939
Massacres in Poland
Zakroczym
Nazi war crimes in Poland
World War II prisoner of war massacres by Nazi Germany
September 1939 events